Mahari Cortijo is a United States Virgin Islands international soccer player who plays as a midfielder.

Club career
In 2018 Cortijo played for youth club 18.3 Massive FC. In July he scored a hat-trick against Brand Nu FC to remain third in the U.S. Virgin Islands Soccer Association’s Under-15 League standings. On the final match day of the season, Cortijo scored a goal as 18.3 Massive beat Raymix SC 12–0. The team ended the season with the most points in the league table. Cortijo served as the team captain and was its top scorer as it ultimately won the championship that season.

International career
Cortijo was selected to represent the USVI at the youth level in 2017 CONCACAF U-17 Championship qualifying and 2019 CONCACAF U-17 Championship qualifying. 

In March 2021 he was called up to the senior squad for a warm-up friendly and its first two  2022 FIFA World Cup qualification matches. He eventually made his senior debut on June 5, 2021 against El Salvador in the same competition, coming on as a substitute in the 59th minute.

Career statistics

International

References

External links

Living people
2002 births
United States Virgin Islands soccer players
United States Virgin Islands international soccer players
Association football midfielders